Natthakarn Chinwong ( born 15 March 1992) is a Thai international footballer who plays as a midfielder.

References

External links 
 
 

1992 births
Living people
Women's association football defenders
Natthakarn Chinwong
Footballers at the 2014 Asian Games
Natthakarn Chinwong
Natthakarn Chinwong
Southeast Asian Games medalists in football
Footballers at the 2018 Asian Games
Competitors at the 2013 Southeast Asian Games
Competitors at the 2017 Southeast Asian Games
2019 FIFA Women's World Cup players
Natthakarn Chinwong
Competitors at the 2019 Southeast Asian Games
2015 FIFA Women's World Cup players
Natthakarn Chinwong
Natthakarn Chinwong
Natthakarn Chinwong